"Insomnia" is a song by Welsh rock band Feeder, released as the second single from their album Yesterday Went Too Soon. It reached number 22 on the UK Singles Chart and was at the time Feeder's fourth consecutive single to reach the top 40.

When the single charted in the UK, it was their biggest hit at the time and got them on the popular now defunct UK music show "Top Of The Pops". From there the band's awareness increased and the follow-up single "Yesterday Went Too Soon" cracked the top 20 and helped the album of the same name go top 10. It also seen their only performance on TFI Friday, also a now defunct TV show.

"Insomnia" is inspired by singer Grant Nicholas's experience of Feeder's first US tour in 1998 when he broke his ankle (among other injuries) and found it hard to sleep at nights.

Reception
Michael Gallucci of AllMusic called "Insomnia" a "fine moment."

Music video
The music video for Insomnia features Grant Nicholas, Taka Hirose, and late drummer Jon Lee performing in a hotel room and other various places including the band on a train and places around New York City.

Track listings

UK CD1
 "Insomnia"
 "Space Age Hero"
 "Living in Polaroid"

UK CD2
 "Insomnia"
 "Divebomb"
 "Fly"

UK cassette single
 "Insomnia"
 "Cement" (live)
 "High" (live)

Australian CD single
 "Insomnia"
 "Space Age Hero"
 "Living in Polaroid"
 "Divebomb"
 "Fly"

Charts

Release history

Media usage
In the 2000 Channel 4 TV series Lock, Stock..., which was a spin-off of the film Lock Stock and Two Smoking Barrels, "Insomnia" was heard playing at high volume from a gang members ghetto blaster during one of the episodes. It also features on the soundtrack album of the series.

References

1998 songs
1999 singles
The Echo Label singles
Feeder songs
Songs written by Grant Nicholas